"Pretty Visitors" is a song by British band Arctic Monkeys, featured as the ninth song off of their 2009 album Humbug. It is noted for its organ intro and rapid-fire drums, as well as its enigmatic and quick-spoken lyrics. It was debuted on the Australia and New Zealand legs of the Humbug tour, where lead singer Alex Turner would play a Vox Super Continental Organ; these keyboard duties were then handed down to touring musician John Ashton for the remainder of the tour. The song has become a fan favorite and is frequently played during live performances. The song was originally intended to be the 3rd and final single released for the album, however was switched out for "My Propeller" shortly before release.

Personnel
Alex Turner – lead and backing vocals, Vox Super Continental Organ, slide guitar
Jamie Cook – rhythm guitar
Nick O'Malley – bass guitar, backing vocals
Matt Helders – drums

References

Arctic Monkeys songs
Songs written by Alex Turner (musician)